Elatine ojibwayensis, also known as the Ojibway waterwort, is a species of plant in the genus Elatine. It is endemic to Quebec, Canada. It is listed as critically imperiled by NatureServe.

References

Elatinaceae
Endemic flora of Canada